Aditya Academy Ground is a cricket ground in Bengaluru, India. It was established in 2012. The ground is not a first-class venue but it is only used for List A cricket, domestic under-19s or Blind cricket.

In 2012, the first T20 Blind Cricket World Cup was held in Bangalore and the Aditya Academy Ground was one of venue and host 19 matches of it. India defeated Pakistan by 29 runs in the final.

In 2014, the ground hosted its first Vijay Hazare Trophy matches when Hyderabad cricket team played against Tamil Nadu cricket team. Two more List A Matches are played on this ground.

See also

 India national blind cricket team
 Blind cricket

References

Cricket grounds in Karnataka
Sports venues in Bangalore
Sports venues completed in 2012
2012 establishments in Karnataka